Mimoeme pseudamerica is a species of beetle in the family Cerambycidae. It was described by Touroult, Dalens and Tavakilian in 2010.

References

Oemini
Beetles described in 2010